2001 census may refer to a census covered by:

 Census in Australia#2001
 2001 Bangladesh census
 2001 Bolivian census
 Canada 2001 Census
 2001 census of Croatia
 2001 Census of India
 Lithuanian census of 2001
 2001 Nepal census
 2001 New Zealand census
 South African National Census of 2001
 Ukrainian Census (2001)
 United Kingdom Census 2001